The Canada–India Free Trade Agreement is a free trade agreement which is currently at negotiation level, between Canada and India.

See also 
 Free trade agreements of Canada
 Economy of Canada
 Canada's Global Markets Action Plan

References 

India
Free trade agreements